As Long as You Are is the sixth studio album by American synth-pop band Future Islands, released on October 9, 2020.

Track listing
All tracks are written by Gerrit Welmers, Michael Lowry, Samuel T. Herring, and William Cashion. All tracks are engineered and mixed by Steve Wright.

Charts

References

2020 albums
Future Islands albums
4AD albums
Albums produced by Chris Coady